New Birth may refer to:

 New Birth (band), an American musical group
 The New Birth (album), their 1970 debut album
 Born again, a spiritual rebirth in some forms of Christianity
 Regeneration (theology), a Christian theological concept
 Dvija, a Hindu theological concept
 New Birth Missionary Baptist Church, a megachurch in Georgia, United States